Andreas Walsperger (born c. 1415 in Radkersburg; date of death unknown) was a German cartographer of the 15th century. The son of a carpenter, he became a Benedictine monk at St. Peter's in Salzburg in 1434. He left the monastery in 1442. Little more is known about him except that in 1448/9 he created his map in Konstanz.

The map 

The map of Andreas Walsperger is a Latin Mappa Mundi, atypical in its depiction of Africa and in its placing a large castle in China, where others including Fra Mauro's place their grand castle to the north. In Germany, the only other example of the type is the "Mappa mundi Ciziensis" from Zeitz.

The parchment measures 57.7 x 75 cm.

Ownership
In the sixteenth century, the Fugger family may have owned the map. In 1622, it was given to Pope Gregory XV by Maximilian I, Elector of Bavaria and is now held in the Vatican Library Palatina (Lat. 1362 B).

References

Further reading
 
 Karl-Heinz Meine: Zur Weltkarte des Andreas Walsperger, Konstanz 1448. In: Wolfgang Scharfe u.a. (Hrsg.): Kartenhistorisches Colloquium Bayreuth '82. Vorträge und Berichte. Dietrich Reimer Verlag, Berlin, 1983,

External links
http://www.bad-radkersburg-online.at/bad-radkersburg/pers3.htm zur Person des Andreas Walsberger

1415 births
Year of death unknown
People from Bad Radkersburg
German cartographers
German geographers
German Benedictines